Harry Hiestand (born November 19, 1958) is a former American football coach who last was the offensive line coach at the University of Notre Dame. Hiestand earned his bachelor's degree in health and physical education from East Stroudsburg University in 1983. He and his wife, Terri, have three sons, Michael, Matthew and Mark, and one daughter, Sarah.

Playing career
Hiestand played college football as an offensive lineman at Springfield College and East Stroudsburg between 1978 and 1980. He played at the latter alongside future New York Giants offensive line coach Pat Flaherty, but injuries shortened his playing career in his junior year.

Coaching career

Early career
In his first coaching jobs, Hiestand was an offensive line coach at Toledo (1988), graduate assistant coach at Southern California (1987) and tight ends and assistant line coach at Penn (1986). He began his coaching career at his alma mater, East Stroudsburg University, after an injury ended his playing days. Hiestand has been a part of league championship teams at five of his seven stops, at East Stroudsburg (1982–83), Penn (1986), USC (1987), Cincinnati (1993) and Illinois (2001). He was on the Trojan staff at the 1988 Rose Bowl.

Cincinnati
Hiestand came to the University of Cincinnati in 1989 after a year at Toledo. He served as run game coordinator with the Bearcats in 1992 and offensive coordinator in 1993.  As offensive coordinator, running back David Small broke Cincinnati's record for rushing touchdowns while the offense posted the 7th most points in school history.  Cincinnati's 1993 team went 8-3 after a 3-8 record the previous campaign.

Missouri
After a five-year stint at Cincinnati, went to the University of Missouri. With the Tigers, Hiestand helped MU to a No. 9 national ranking in rushing at 250.7 yards per game in 1996. In that same year, three of Hiestand's offensive lineman garnered All-Big 12 honors.

Illinois
From 1997–2004, Hiestand served as offensive line coach in Ron Turner's system and also was assistant head coach from 2000 until his departure.

During his tenure, Hiestand has produced 10 All-Big Ten selections on the offensive line. In 2002, Illinois marched out one of the nation's most balanced offensive attacks thanks in large part to Hiestand's offensive front. Illinois topped 5,300 yards in total offense for the first time in school history and running back Antoineo Harris topped the Illinois single season rushing yardage list with 1,330 yards. Seniors Tony Pashos and David Diehl each earned All-Big Ten accolades, and were fifth-round picks in the 2003 NFL Draft. 

In 2001, Hiestand tutored a pair of linemen to first team All-Big Ten accolades. Both Jay Kulaga and Pashos were named to the Big Ten's first team by the coaches and media, while senior center Luke Butkus was a second-team selection. Illinois topped the 5,000-yard total offense mark for the first time in school history. 

In 2000, Marques Sullivan and Ray Redziniak earned second-team All-Big Ten honors for the second straight year and Sullivan was named to the Football Writers Association All-America third-team. That season the line allowed only 20 sacks, the 17th lowest in the nation. 

In 1999, Hiestand's line led Illinois to the highest scoring offense in school history with 388 points scored in 12 games. The UI offensive line cleared paths for Illini running backs to rush for 2,082 yards and provided quarterback Kurt Kittner the room to throw for 2,702 yards and 24 touchdown passes. Sullivan and Redziniak earned second-team All-Big Ten honors.

During his tenure at Illinois, Hiestand tutored 12 all-Big Ten selections on the offensive line. Every senior starting offensive lineman in Hiestand's first seven years with the Illini was signed to an NFL contract: Ryan Schau (1995–98), J. P. Machado (1995–98), Marques Sullivan (1997–2000), Ray Redziniak (1997–2000), Luke Butkus (1998–2001), Dave Diehl (1999–2002), and Tony Pashos (1999–2002).

Chicago Bears
Hiestand was hired on January 11, 2005 as Chicago’s offensive line coach. The Bears were one of six teams to have the same five offensive linemen start all 16 games in 2008 (C Olin Kreutz, LG Josh Beekman, RG Roberto Garza, LT John St. Clair and RT John Tait), marking the first time since 2001 that Chicago had the same five players start all 16 contests along the line. 

The offensive line would become the most experienced unit on the Bears roster over the next couple of years, led by 11-year veteran and six-time Pro Bowl C Kreutz, who entered the 2009 season having started a team-high 102 consecutive games. 

In 2008, Chicago’s offense attempted 557 pass plays and absorbed 29 sacks. In 2006, the Bears attempted 539 pass plays and allowed just 25 sacks, the lowest total given up by the team since allowing 17 in 2001, as Chicago went on to win the 2006 NFC Championship leading to the organization’s first Super Bowl appearance in 21 years.

Tennessee and Notre Dame 
After spending two years coaching the offensive line at the University of Tennessee from 2010–2012, Hiestand was hired to the same post at the University of Notre Dame under head coach Brian Kelly. Since reaching the BCS National Championship Game during his first season at Notre Dame, Hiestand has developed a number of current and former NFL offensive linemen with the Fighting Irish, including:
 Mike Golic Jr., Former Pittsburgh Steelers offensive guard 
 Braxston Cave, Former Detroit Lions center 
 Zack Martin, Dallas Cowboys offensive guard
 Chris Watt, Former New Orleans Saints offensive guard 
 Ronnie Stanley, Baltimore Ravens offensive tackle 
 Nick Martin, Las Vegas Raiders offensive guard
 Quenton Nelson, Indianapolis Colts offensive guard
 Mike McGlinchey, San Francisco 49ers offensive tackle
 Alex Bars, Chicago Bears offensive guard (graduated after 2018 season)
 Sam Mustipher, Chicago Bears center (graduated after 2018 season)

Second stint with Bears
On January 10, 2018, Hiestand returned to the Bears after being hired by new head coach Matt Nagy as the offensive line coach.

Under Hiestand, the 2018 Bears allowed 33 sacks, tied for the eighth-fewest in the NFL. Center Cody Whitehair and left tackle Charles Leno Jr. were named to their first Pro Bowl to become the first Bears offensive linemen teammates to make the all-star game since 2006.

In 2019, however, Chicago's offensive line allowed 43 sacks (12th most in the league) and helped the offense record just 91.1 rushing yards per game (sixth worst). Hiestand was fired on December 31.

References

External links
 Notre Dame profile

1958 births
Living people
American football offensive linemen
Chicago Bears coaches
Cincinnati Bearcats football coaches
East Stroudsburg Warriors football coaches
East Stroudsburg Warriors football players
Illinois Fighting Illini football coaches
Missouri Tigers football coaches
Notre Dame Fighting Irish football coaches
Penn Quakers football coaches
Springfield Pride football players
Tennessee Volunteers football coaches
Toledo Rockets football coaches
USC Trojans football coaches
Wyoming Seminary alumni
People from Malvern, Pennsylvania
Coaches of American football from Pennsylvania
Players of American football from Pennsylvania
American people of Swiss descent